The Chamera Dam impounds the River Ravi and supports the hydroelectricity project in the region. It is located near the town of Dalhousie, in the Chamba district in the state of Himachal Pradesh in India. The reservoir of the dam is the Chamera Lake. Large part of its reservoir lies in Salooni sub-division of Chamba.

After completion of the first phase 1994, the Chamera-I generates 540 MW (3x180 MW) of electricity. The second stage i.e. Chamera-II Dam generates 300 MW (3X100 MW) of electricity. From year 2012, the 3rd stage i.e. Chamera III generates 231 MW (3x77) of electricity.

The unique feature of the region is the fluctuating day and night temperature. The temperature during the day near the dam rises up to 35 degrees Celsius and drops to a minimum of 18 to 20 °C at night.

The water level in the Chamera Lake rises to a maximum of 763 meters while the minimum water level is 747 meters.

The absence of aquatic life in the lake has made it an ideal location for water sports. According to the plan developed by the tourism department, the lake shares the scope of sports activities like rowing, motor boating, paddle boating, sailing, canoeing, angling and kayaking. House boats and shikaras are also available. The government attempts to provide all these facilities to the tourists.

Features
The catchment area of the dam is 472.5 km2. The reservoir has a live storage capacity of 110 MCM and mean annual inflow of 1,273 BCM. Its FRL and MDDL  are 760m and 747m.

The power house has 3 units of 180 MW each and has a firm power of 160MW

After the completion of Chamera Power Station Stage - II (3X100 MW) in the year 2003, the Chamera Dam has been renamed Chamera Power Station Stage - I. The third stage of the Ravi Basin Projects Chamera Stage - III (77X3 MW) is also completed and is under operation now. All the three stages of Chamera are owned by NHPC Limited a company listed on the National Stock Exchange of India (Code NHPC). The stage - I is a storage hydroelectric project while stage - II and III are run of the river schemes.

See also

 List of dams and reservoirs in India

References

External links
 NHPC Ltd., National Hydroelectric Power Corporation

Hydroelectric power stations in Himachal Pradesh
Dams in Himachal Pradesh
Dams completed in 1997
Dams on the Ravi River
Buildings and structures in Chamba district
1994 establishments in Uttar Pradesh
20th-century architecture in India